MapleSim is a Modelica-based, multi-domain modeling and simulation tool developed by Maplesoft. MapleSim generates model equations, runs simulations, and performs analyses using the symbolic and numeric mathematical engine of Maple. Models are created by dragging-and-dropping components from a library into a central workspace, resulting in a model that represents the physical system in a graphical form.
Maplesoft began development of MapleSim partly in response to a request from Toyota to produce physical modeling tools to aid in their new model-based development process.

The MapleSim library includes many components that can be connected together to model a system. These components are from areas of science and engineering such as electrical, mechanical, and thermal engineering fields. MapleSim also includes traditional signal flow components that can be combined with other physical components in the workspace. Thus, MapleSim is able to combine causal modeling methods with acausal techniques that do not require specification of signal flow direction between all components.

The use of Maple underneath MapleSim allows all of the system equations to be generated and simplified automatically. The user can explore their system in various ways, such as viewing the equations behind their model and performing parameter optimization. The use of the Maple mathematics engine also allows for MapleSim to incorporate such features as units management and solving of high-order DAEs that are typically encountered in complex acausal models.

Release history

Add-on libraries & tools 

 MapleSim Connector
 ANSI C base Simulink S-function code generation
 MapleSim Connector for FMI
 FMU generation based on FMI Standard
B&R MapleSim Connector
Integration tool for B&R Automation Studio and MapleSim models
MapleSim Connector for LabVIEW and NI Veristand
 Code generation for NI LabVIEW Software
 MapleSim Connector for JMAG-RT
 Import JMAG-RT file into MapleSim model
 MapleSim CAD Toolbox
 Import various CAD models into MapleSim then automatically recreating the model components in MapleSim
 MapleSim Tire Library
 Industry standard tire component library which includes Fiala, Calspan and Pacejka 2002 types.
 MapleSim Driveline Library
 Component library for powertrain modeling in automotive engineering such as differential, wheels and road loads. 
 MapleSim Battery Library
 Supports electrochemical and equivalent-circuit models for battery system modeling
 MapleSim Hydraulics Library from Modelon
 Third-party version for Hydraulics component models
 MapleSim Pneumatics Library from Modelon
 Third-party version for Pneumatics component models
MapleSim Engine Dynamics Library from Modelon
Third-party version of Engine Dynamics Library which can be used for modeling and simulation for combustion engine in automotive applications.
MapleSim Heat Transfer Library from CYBERNET
 System-level simulation for Heat Transfer effects in MapleSim model based on automatically generated discretization approach.
 MapleSim Control Design Toolbox
 Provides a set of commands for controller design such as PID working with plant models designed by MapleSim. These commands are used in Maple.
 MapleSim Explorer
 Viewer version of MapleSim that can run simulation of MapleSim models.
 MapleSim Server
 Web deployment option that can serve MapleSim models on web browser or tablets.

See also 
 AMESim
 APMonitor
 Computer simulation
 Control engineering
 Dymola
 EcosimPro
 EMSO simulator
 Hardware-in-the-loop simulation
 Maple (software)
 Mechatronics
 Model-based design
 Modelica
 SimulationX
 Vehicle dynamics
 Wolfram SystemModeler

References

External links 
 MapleSim home page
MapleSim Model Gallery
List of research papers that Maplesoft products are used

Maplesoft
Plotting software
Mathematical optimization software
Computer algebra system software for Linux
Computer algebra system software for Windows
Computer algebra system software for macOS
Cross-platform software
Simulation software